The Qualcomm Emergency Download mode, commonly known as Qualcomm EDL mode and officially known as Qualcomm HS-USB QD-Loader 9008 is a feature implemented in the boot ROM of a system on a chip by Qualcomm which can be used to recover bricked smartphones. On Google's Pixel 3, the feature was accidentally shown to users after the phone was bricked.

Device support 

For a device to support EDL it must be using Qualcomm hardware. The most widespread SoC from Qualcomm is the Snapdragon.

Access

ADB 
The Android Debug Bridge can be utilized to get access to EDL mode, with the command adb reboot edl.

Windows 
The Qualcomm Product Support Tool (QPST) is normally used internally by service center executives for low-level firmware flashing to revive Android devices from a hard-brick or to fix persistent software issues. To flash the firmware, the tool communicates with supported devices via EDL. The QPST has not been officially released by Qualcomm.

Linux 
Qualcomm Download (QDL) is a tool to communicate with Qualcomm System On a Chip bootroms to install or execute code. The source code is maintained by Bjorn Andersson aka andersson.

References 

Qualcomm